The S.E.A. Write Award, or Southeast Asian Writers Award, is an award that is presented annually since 1979 to poets and writers of Southeast Asia.

The awards are given to the writers from each of the countries that comprise the Association of Southeast Asian Nations, though not all countries in ASEAN are represented every year. The award is sometimes given for a specific work by an author, or it could be awarded for lifetime achievement. The types of works that are honored vary, and have included poetry, short stories, novels, plays, folklore, and scholarly and religious works.

The ceremonies are held in Bangkok, with a member of the Thai royal family presiding. The award was conceived by the management of The Oriental hotel in Bangkok, which then sought further backing from Thai Airways International and other companies. The ceremonies have featured some notable guest speakers, including Iris Murdoch, Peter Ustinov, Jeffrey Archer, James A. Michener, Gore Vidal, William Golding, Rita Dove and Paul Theroux.  The 2006 keynote speaker, Nobel Prize laureate Wole Soyinka canceled his keynote speech in protest against the Thai military's coup against the government, and was replaced at the last moment by S. P. Somtow.

The 2011 ceremony was postponed until February 2012 because of the 2011 Thailand floods. Edwin Thumboo was the keynote speaker. The 2016–18 ceremonies were postponed due to the passing of the Thai king in 2016. The three Singaporean winners received their awards in November 2019.

List of S.E.A. Write Award winners

1979–1989
Until 1984, ASEAN comprising Indonesia, Malaysia, the Philippines, Singapore and Thailand. Brunei was admitted in 1984 and its first S.E.A. Write honoree was named in 1986.

1990–1994

1995–1999
Vietnam joined ASEAN in 1995 and named its first S.E.A. Write honoree in 1996. Laos and Myanmar were admitted in 1997 and named their first honorees in 1998. Cambodia joined ASEAN in 1999, and named its first S.E.A. Write honoree that same year.

2000s

2010s

References

External links
 S.E.A. Write Awards website

 
Asian literary awards
Thai literary awards 
Southeast Asian culture
Awards established in 1979